The Interstate 78 Toll Bridge (I-78 Toll Bridge) carries Interstate 78 across the Delaware River between Williams Township, Pennsylvania and Phillipsburg, New Jersey in the Lehigh Valley region of eastern Pennsylvania and western New Jersey in the United States. The bridge opened on November 21, 1989 and is operated by the Delaware River Joint Toll Bridge Commission (DRJTBC). As of 2008, the bridge carried an average of 56,100 vehicles daily.

A toll is charged only for traffic heading west into Pennsylvania. The toll plaza has four conventional lanes and two Express E-ZPass lanes. Just after the toll plaza is the Pennsylvania Welcome Center. 

The jurisdiction of the DRJTBC for the bridge extends between the first interchange on either side of the bridge, which includes 2.2 miles west along I-78 to just west of Exit 75 in Pennsylvania and 4.2 miles east in New Jersey to Exit 3.

Tolls
Tolls on the Interstate 78 Toll Bridge are incurred only by motorists leaving New Jersey and entering Pennsylvania. There is no toll for those leaving Pennsylvania and entering New Jersey. On April 11, 2021, tolls on the I-78 Toll Bridge increased to $1.25 for motorists entering Pennsylvania with E-ZPass and $3.00 for motorists entering Pennsylvania without E-ZPass. An additional toll increase is planned in 2024.

See also 
 List of crossings of the Delaware River

References

External links 
 DRJTBC Official page

Delaware River Joint Toll Bridge Commission
1989 establishments in New Jersey
1989 establishments in Pennsylvania
Bridges completed in 1989
Bridges in Northampton County, Pennsylvania
Bridges in Warren County, New Jersey
Bridges on the Interstate Highway System
Bridges over the Delaware River
Concrete bridges in the United States
Girder bridges in the United States
Interstate 78
Phillipsburg, New Jersey
Road bridges in New Jersey
Road bridges in Pennsylvania
Toll bridges in New Jersey
Toll bridges in Pennsylvania
Tolled sections of Interstate Highways
Interstate vehicle bridges in the United States